
The gens Sinicia was an obscure plebeian family at ancient Rome.  No members of this gens are mentioned by ancient writers, but a few are known from inscriptions, mostly from Numidia, where they were locally prominent.  Lucius Sinicius Reginus followed the cursus honorum at Rome, reaching the rank of praetor.

Members

 Sinicius, named on a piece of pottery from Segodunum in Gallia Aquitania.
 Sinicius Fortunatus, an advocatus in the court of Lambaesis in Numidia, mentioned in an inscription dedicated to their patron, Tiberius Julius Pollienus Auspex, dating between AD 211 and 222.
 Publius Sinicius P. f. Munatius, a veteran soldier, buried at Castellum Arsacalitanum in Numidia, aged twenty-two, with a monument dedicated by his wife, Livia.
 Lucius Sinicius Reginus, buried at Rome in the late second century, had been tribune of the plebs, quaestor in Macedonia, and praetor.
 Sinicius Rufus, the brother of Sinicius Fortunatus, and likewise an advocatus at Lambaesis during the early third century.
 Sextus Sinicius Rufus, one of the flamines at Lambaesis.

See also
 List of Roman gentes

References

Bibliography
 Theodor Mommsen et alii, Corpus Inscriptionum Latinarum (The Body of Latin Inscriptions, abbreviated CIL), Berlin-Brandenburgische Akademie der Wissenschaften (1853–present).
 René Cagnat et alii, L'Année épigraphique (The Year in Epigraphy, abbreviated AE), Presses Universitaires de France (1888–present).
 Paul von Rohden, Elimar Klebs, & Hermann Dessau, Prosopographia Imperii Romani (The Prosopography of the Roman Empire, abbreviated PIR), Berlin (1898).
 La Carte Archéologique de la Gaule (Archaeological Map of Gaul, abbreviated CAG), Académie des Inscriptions et Belles-Lettres (1931–present).

Roman gentes